IceWall SSO is a Web and Federated single sign-on software developed and marketed by Hewlett Packard Enterprise over the globe.

Overview 
IceWall SSO was originally developed by HP Japan. Since its first release in 1997, IceWall SSO has seen its adoption in intranet, B-to-C, B-to-B, and many other services globally with more than 40 million user licenses sold so far all over the world. 
Its latest version, IceWall SSO 10.0, now provides support for new leading-edge technologies such as cloud and virtualization, and the IceWall SSO product line has been extended to include Windows support in addition to the existing HP-UX and Linux versions. Furthermore, the support services for IceWall SSO are planned to continue until 2024, making it a product that has a long and stable service life

Latest version available is 10.0. (as of August 2010)
Supported Platforms are Red Hat Enterprise Linux, HP-UX and Windows Server.
IceWall SSO mainly has Reverse Proxy type implementation, but it can be configured to work as an Agent type as well depending on the requirements.

Architecture 
IceWall SSO mainly consists of two modules.

 Forwarder
A CGI process which works as a Reverse Proxy. It accepts http/https requests from Web browser and forwards them to backend applications. Forwarder also handles loginprocess and authorizations by communicating with Authentication module mentioned below.

 Authentication module
A daemon program which accepts requests from Forwarder and performs authentication by getting user information from Certification DB (Directory services or RDB).
ICP(IceWall Cert Protocol) is used between Forwarder and Authentication Module.

Contemporary products 
 Access Manager: Novell
 Access Manager: Oracle
 SiteMinder: CA Technologies
 Tivoli Access Manager (TAM): IBM
 WebSAM SECUREMASTER: NEC

See also 
 Hewlett-Packard Japan
 Single sign-on

References

HP software
Middleware
Federated identity